Adam Banton (born February 28, 1975, in Nokesville, Virginia) is an American freestyle BMX rider and MTB rider, professional musician and part owner of The Biker and Baker granola. He's known to have resided in Phoenix, Arizona. His riding style is regarded as progressive and creative while not limited to any specific genre of Freestyle BMX.  He began riding in 1987 after being influenced by a Dennis McCoy demo clip on his local news station.

Adam is currently sponsored by Odyssey, Badger Balm, Space Brace C.T.I Knee-Braces. He has had two different signature Odyssey grips, and has had a signature Odyssey "B.E.T.A." backpack. Adam's personal bike was added to the Flick Trix BMX finger bike line. He also has worked with Armourdillo on a signature belt and wallet series.

Adam was acknowledged and credited for inventing the downside tailwhip by RideBMX Magazine in 2016.

Adam has also been featured in multiple magazines such as Dig BMX, BMX Plus!, Ride BMX, Ride UK. and  Woodward West Winter Camp brochure

Adam and his music have been featured in a series of BMX videos spanning over 15 years. He has released four full-length albums and his third on vinyl most recently. Adam has been a featured athlete on Fuel TV's Daily Habit, performing from his self-titled first recording Adam Banton and his second Songs from Here and There. Additionally, he was a featured athlete and music performer on Props Rock n Roll Road Fools (tour) that also aired on Fuel TV.

When not focused on riding he makes music like his latest fourth full-length album "INDIVISIBLE" Adam can be found working on short, original compositions that can be heard throughout the BMX and action sports industry. He cites his father and his uncle, as major musical influences.

References

External links
 Adam Banton Instagram Account 
 
 Adam Banton's Official Facebook Page
 Adam Banton's Official Twitter
 Adam Banton's Odyssey Team Page
 Adam Banton Granola company 

1975 births
Living people
Musicians from Salt Lake City
People from Nokesville, Virginia
BMX riders
Sportspeople from Salt Lake City
American male cyclists
Cyclists from Utah
Cyclists from Virginia